Pukapuka–Nassau is a Cook Islands electoral division returning one member to the Cook Islands Parliament.  Its current representative is Tingika Elikana, who has held the seat since 2018.

The electorate was created by the Cook Islands Constitution in 1964 and has not been adjusted since. It consists of the islands of Pukapuka and Nassau.

Members of Parliament for Pukapuka-Nassau
Unless otherwise stated, all MPs terms began and ended at general elections.

References

Pukapuka
Nassau (Cook Islands)
Cook Islands electorates